Bendich Ahin (died 1402), also known as Maestro Bendit and Baruch Chaim (Barukh Ḥayyīm), was a fourteenth-century Jewish physician, astrologer, and mathematician in Arles.

In 1369, Ahin became court physician to Queen Joanna I of Naples. In recognition of his medical services, he was exempted from Jewish taxes and tallages. The privilege was extended to his descendants. According to Nostradamus, Ahin's astrological knowledge led him to predict the Queen's tragic death.

Notes

References

 

1402 deaths
14th-century births
14th-century French mathematicians
14th-century French physicians
14th-century astrologers
Court physicians
Jewish scientists
Medieval Jewish astrologers
Medieval Jewish physicians of France
Medieval French astrologers
Provençal Jews
14th-century French Jews